Nebria kabakovi is a species of ground beetle in the Nebriinae subfamily that is endemic to Afghanistan.

References

kabakovi
Beetles described in 1982
Beetles of Asia
Endemic fauna of Afghanistan